George William Church, Sr. (March 30, 1887 – November 18, 1956) was an American businessman who founded Church's Chicken.

Career
Church was born in Oak Grove, Missouri in 1887 to Isaac Wesley Church (1863-1952) and Mary Josephine Webb (1866-1932).

On April 17, 1952, Church started Church's Fried Chicken-To-Go, across the road from The Alamo in San Antonio, Texas.

Prior to his retirement, Church was an incubator salesman.

Personal life
In 1913, Church married Jessie May Pollard (1894-1988) and had 5 children.

After Church's sudden death in 1956, the restaurant was willed to his son, George W. "Bill" Church, Jr. (December 23, 1932 – February 7, 2014). Bill Church continued operations of the business in 1962, and further built the franchise with his partner David Bamberger before selling it.

References 

1887 births
1956 deaths
American food company founders
Fast-food chain founders
20th-century American businesspeople